Captain Scarlet and the Mysterons, often shortened to Captain Scarlet, is a British science fiction television series created by Gerry and Sylvia Anderson and filmed by their production company Century 21 Productions for distributor ITC Entertainment. Running to thirty-two 25-minute episodes, it was first broadcast on ITV regional franchises between 1967 and 1968 and has since been transmitted in more than 40 other countries, including the United States, Canada, Australia, New Zealand and Japan. It is one of several Anderson series that were filmed using a form of electronic marionette puppetry dubbed "Supermarionation" combined with scale model special effects sequences.

Set in 2068, Captain Scarlet follows the "war of nerves" between Earth and the Mysterons, a race of Martians who possess partial control over matter. When a misunderstanding causes human astronauts to attack their city on Mars, the Mysterons vow revenge and launch reprisals against Earth. These are countered by Spectrum, a worldwide security organisation. In the first episode, Spectrum agent Captain Scarlet acquires the Mysterons' self-healing power of "retrometabolism" and is thus rendered "indestructible", being able to recover from otherwise fatal injuries. In this way, Scarlet becomes Spectrum's top asset in its fight against the Mysterons.

Captain Scarlet, the eighth of the Andersons' ten puppet series, was preceded by Thunderbirds and followed by Joe 90 and The Secret Service. In terms of visual aesthetic, it represents a departure from Thunderbirds in its use of non-caricatured puppets sculpted to realistic body proportions. Repeated several times in the UK, it has generated tie-ins from toy cars and action figures to audio plays and original novels, as well as strips in the weekly children's comic TV Century 21.

Compared to Thunderbirds, Stingray, and earlier Anderson productions, Captain Scarlet is generally considered "darker" in tone and less suited to child audiences due to its violent content and themes of alien aggression and interplanetary war. The change in puppet design has divided opinion, while the wisdom of making the protagonist "indestructible" has also been questioned. However, the series has been praised for its use of a multinational, multi-ethnic puppet cast and depiction of a utopian future Earth. A computer-animated reboot, Gerry Anderson's New Captain Scarlet, was first broadcast in 2005.

Plot

The series begins in 2068. In the first episode, the crew of the Zero-X spacecraft are investigating the surface of Mars after mysterious radio signals are found to be coming from the planet. The source is discovered to be an alien city, which the astronauts destroy in a missile attack after mistaking a harmless surveillance device for a weapon. The city's inhabitants, the Mysterons, are a collective of sentient computers that possess partial control over matter and communicate in a deep, echoing voice. After using their power of "reversing matter" to rebuild their city, they swear revenge for humanity's unwarranted aggression and declare war on Earth.

Also called "retrometabolism", reversing matter enables the Mysterons to re-create people and objects as facsimiles that they can control. This ability is used to wage a "war of nerves" against Earth in which the Mysterons issue threats against specific targets (from world leaders and military installations to entire cities and continents) and then destroy and reconstruct whatever instruments are needed (whether human beings or objects) to carry out their plans. The presence of the Mysterons is indicated by twin rings of green light that are projected onto scenes of destruction and reconstruction. Although the aliens are able to influence events from Mars, their actions on Earth are usually performed by their replicated intermediaries.

Zero-X mission leader Captain Black becomes the Mysterons' primary agent when they seize control of his mind. Prior to the events of the series, Black was an officer in Spectrum, a worldwide security organisation that mobilises its personnel, vehicles and other resources to counter the threat posed by the Mysterons. Cloudbase is defended by Angel Interceptor fighters flown by an all-female team of pilots headed by Destiny Angel, while the base's computer systems are operated by White's assistant, Lieutenant Green. Spectrum also incorporates a fleet of armoured Spectrum Pursuit Vehicles (SPV), which are hidden in secret locations around the world, as well as patrol cars, maximum-security transports, passenger jet aircraft and machine gun-equipped helicopters.

Captain Scarlet becomes Spectrum's main asset in its fight against the Mysterons after the events of the first episode, in which the Mysterons attempt to assassinate the World President as their first act of retaliation. The original Scarlet is killed in a car accident engineered by the Mysterons and replaced with a reconstruction. However, after being shot by Spectrum's Captain Blue and falling to his death from the top of a tower, the reconstruction returns to life with the consciousness of the original Scarlet restored and is thereafter free of Mysteron control. With his new Mysteron body, Scarlet possesses two extraordinary abilities: he can sense other reconstructions nearby, and if injured or killed, his retrometabolism will restore him to full health, making him virtually "indestructible". As hostilities with Mars continue, Scarlet repeatedly sacrifices himself to thwart the Mysterons, safe in the knowledge that he will always return to face them again.

Over the course of the series, it is found that Mysteron reconstructions are especially vulnerable to electricity and can be identified through X-rays, which cannot penetrate their alien biology. These discoveries allow Spectrum to develop two anti-Mysteron devices: the "Mysteron Gun" and "Mysteron Detector". A three-episode story arc focuses on the discovery of a Mysteron outpost on the Moon, its destruction by Spectrum, and Spectrum's efforts to negotiate with the Mysterons after converting the base's salvaged power source into an interplanetary communication device. A failed attempt to survey Mars from space, aborted military conferences and the sabotaged construction of a new Earth space fleet hinder Spectrum's progress in taking the fight to the Mysterons, and the organisation twice fails to capture Captain Black. In the penultimate episode, the Mysterons destroy Cloudbase itself, but this is later revealed to be a nightmare dreamt by one of the Angels. The final episode is a clip show that leaves the conflict between Earth and Mars unresolved.

Production

When efforts to secure an American network broadcaster for Thunderbirds fell through in July 1966, Lew Grade, owner and financial backer of the Andersons' production company AP Films (APF), capped Thunderbirds Series Two at six episodes and cancelled the production. Having overseen APF's work since the making of Supercar in 1960, Grade was keen for Supermarionation to penetrate the lucrative American market and believed that a new series stood a better chance of landing a sale than a second series of Thunderbirds.

As a result of the cancellation, Gerry Anderson was forced to come up with an idea for a new Supermarionation series. He had once been inspired by the thought of creating a live-action police drama in which the hero would have unexpectedly been murdered halfway through the series and replaced by a new lead character. Now giving fresh consideration to this idea, Anderson realised that a major selling point for his new production could be a character who is killed at the end of each episode and resurrected by the start of the next. This, coupled with contemporary theories about the possibility of life on Mars, led to the idea of an interplanetary war between Earth and its neighbour and a worldwide security organisation being called upon to defend humanity. After further thought, Anderson decided that "Scarlet" would be a suitably unusual name for this organisation's "indestructible" agent, while his partner in the field could be called "Blue". From this, Anderson reasoned that all personnel should have colour codenames and that the organisation should be called "Spectrum". Noting that white light is composed of, and can be broken down into, the colours of the spectrum, he named Spectrum's leader "White".

Intrigued by the oft-heard phrase "life as we know it", Anderson wanted to set his alien villains apart from the conventional extraterrestrials of 1960s TV and film. Working from a basis of "life as we don't know it", he made the Mysterons a collective of sentient computers rather than a race of organic lifeforms (though their exact nature is not explicitly stated in the series itself). The intention was that the original Mysterons were extragalactic beings that established a base on Mars in the distant past before abandoning the planet at the start of the 20th century, leaving their computers behind them.

Anderson's recollections of the Second World War provided inspiration for a number of design aspects. For example, he remembered that during the Battle of Britain, RAF pilots had found it difficult to counter German attacks because having to take off from the ground meant that it took a long time to intercept the enemy. He therefore made Spectrum's headquarters, Cloudbase, an airborne aircraft carrier. According to Anderson, the Mysteron rings were inspired by a TV advertisement for wool that featured the Woolmark logo being projected onto a woman.

Writing and filming

Adopting "The Mysterons" as their working title, Anderson and his wife Sylvia wrote a pilot script in August 1966. This differed significantly from the completed first episode. Originally, it was conceived that the Mysteron reconstruction of Captain Scarlet would be resurrected using an advanced computer, after which he would no longer be a true flesh-and-blood being but a "mechanical man" akin to an android. Another plan, also dropped, was for each episode to feature a "guest star" puppet voiced by a famous actor: the World President, for example, was originally intended to be voiced by Patrick McGoohan.

With Gerry Anderson serving primarily as executive producer, most of the writing was done by Tony Barwick, who had previously written for Thunderbirds. Originally Captain Scarlet's script editor, Barwick went on to pen 18 of its 32 episodes himself, besides making substantial revisions to other writers' work. Discussing his approach to scriptwriting in a 1986 interview, Barwick compared the premise and characters of Captain Scarlet to those of Thunderbirds – for example, likening Spectrum to the heroic International Rescue and the character of Captain Black to recurring villain the Hood.

Filming on the first episode, "The Mysterons", began on 2 January 1967 after two months of pre-production. The budget for the series was set at £1.5 million (approximately £ million in ). At an average cost of £46,000 per episode, or £2,000 per minute, it was the most expensive Anderson production to date. A month before, Anderson and his colleagues had dropped the name "AP Films" and renamed their company "Century 21 Productions".

By the time Captain Scarlet entered production, many of the directors on earlier Anderson series – including Alan Pattillo, David Elliott and David Lane – had either left the company or were committed to the production of Thunderbird 6, the second Thunderbirds feature film. Although Lane, Brian Burgess and Desmond Saunders were able to reprise directorial duties for at least one episode each, the Andersons were forced to promote some of the junior production personnel to replace the outgoing directors. To this end, Alan Perry and Ken Turner were promoted from the camera operator and art departments. Other directors were recruited from outside the company; among them was Robert Lynn, who had been assistant director on films including Black Narcissus, Dracula and The Revenge of Frankenstein. Although Saunders directed only the first episode, he stayed with the production as "supervising director" to guide the new recruits.

Captain Scarlet was filmed in a set of converted factory units on the Slough Trading Estate, which had served as Century 21's studios since the production of Stingray in 1964. Continuing a practice that had started with earlier Anderson series, episodes were filmed in pairs on separate stages to speed up production. Filming overlapped with that of Thunderbird 6, which was being shot on a different stage. Production design duties were split between Keith Wilson and John Lageu, the latter being responsible for the technical elements of the sets. The Mysteron rings were created by panning a transparency of two green circles across the sets using a slide projector, a method suggested by producer Reg Hill.

The scale model-making and special effects were handled by a separate unit headed by effects director Derek Meddings. It comprised two full-time effects crews and a "second unit" responsible for shots presenting flying aircraft. One of the series' technical innovations was that the noses of miniature vehicles would now "dip" as they came to a stop, to imitate the sudden application of brakes on a real-life vehicle. The vehicles were designed by Meddings or his assistant Mike Trim: the former created Cloudbase, the SPV and the Angel fighter (the last of these during a flight to New York), while the latter produced many of the less prominent vehicles. Some of Trim's creations, including the Spectrum Patrol Car, were originally meant to appear in only one episode, but proved so popular with the producers that they became regular features. As production continued, Trim's responsibilities grew, as Meddings was having to devote more and more of his time to the concurrent Thunderbird 6 shoot.

When the series began airing in September 1967, principal photography had been completed on the first 20 episodes. The puppet footage for each episode usually took two weeks or 11 working days to shoot. Although filming was originally expected to be completed in eight months, the demands of the Thunderbird 6 shoot meant that it went on until November.

Puppet design

Supermarionation, a technique by which the movements of the puppets' mouths were electronically synchronised with pre-recorded dialogue, was first employed during the production of Four Feather Falls in 1960. In all Anderson series prior to Captain Scarlet, the puppets' heads had been disproportionately large compared to the rest of their bodies as the cranium contained the solenoid that powered the automatic mouth movements. Scaling up the bodies to match the heads was not an option, as the puppets would have become too heavy to operate and there was not enough studio space to enlarge all of the sets. This gave the puppets a caricatured look that frustrated Gerry Anderson, who wanted their design to reflect natural anatomical proportions. Before Captain Scarlet entered production, Reg Hill and associate producer John Read created a new type of puppet with the solenoid built into the chest, thus enabling the heads to be scaled down to realistic size.

After being sculpted in Plasticine, the puppet heads were moulded on a silicone rubber base and finished in fibreglass. At heights ranging from approximately one-third life sizethe next-generation puppets were no taller or shorter than their predecessors. As in earlier series, the main characters were given interchangeable heads with a range of expressions; these included "smiler", "frowner" and "blinker" heads. Because episodes were to be filmed in pairs on separate stages, the "expressionless" heads were made in duplicate. Costumes were designed by Sylvia Anderson, who drew inspiration from the work of French fashion designer Pierre Cardin (in particular, his 1966 "Cosmonaut" collection) in devising the Spectrum uniforms.

Despite their realistic form, the new puppets were harder to animate on set, making the overall design ironically less lifelike than Gerry Anderson had intended. Compared to the Thunderbirds cast, the Captain Scarlet puppets had inferior weight distribution: when standing, characters often had to be held in place with clamps and tape to prevent wobbling. The smaller heads made close-up shots difficult to obtain, and because most of the wires were headmounted, significantly reduced the puppeteers' level of control, with the result that head movements and other actions became jerkier. To reduce the amount of movement required, characters were frequently shown standing on moving walkways or sitting at moving desks: for example, Lieutenant Green operates the Cloudbase computer from a sliding chair and Colonel White's desk rotates. Puppeteer Jan King commented:

The "under-controlled" puppets described by King had no wires and were manipulated from the waist. One advantage of this method was that a puppet could pass through a doorway without necessitating a break in the shot. For shots of characters sitting in aircraft cockpits, variations of the "under-controlled" design were made comprising only a head and torso; these were operated using levers and wires located beneath the set.

Scarlet's appearance has been compared to that of his voice actor, Francis Matthews, as well as Roger Moore. Ed Bishop, the voice of Captain Blue, believed that his character was modelled on him; however, Terry Curtis, who sculpted the Blue puppet said that he used himself as the template and simply added a blond wig after he learnt that Bishop would be supplying the voice. Curtis, a James Bond fan, based Captain Grey on Sean Connery and Destiny Angel on Ursula Andress, Connery's co-star in Dr No (1962). Lieutenant Green was modelled on Cy Grant, who voiced the character, while Rhapsody Angel was based on Jean Shrimpton, Melody Angel on Eartha Kitt and Harmony Angel on Tsai Chin.

Prior to Captain Scarlet, guest characters had been sculpted in clay on an episode-by-episode basis. For Captain Scarlet, however, these roles were played by a "repertory company" of over 50 puppets made to the same standards of workmanship as the regular characters. Called "revamp puppets", or just "revamps", these puppets were superficially altered for each new role by changing the colours or styles of their wigs, or adding or removing facial hair. Puppets from Captain Scarlet appeared in supporting roles in the final two Supermarionation series, Joe 90 and The Secret Service.

Response to the puppets
The redesigned puppets have drawn a mixed response from crew members and commentators. Some members of the crew believed that the new marionettes lacked the charm of the previous generation due to the natural body proportions that were now being used. Director David Lane recalls that when he first saw the prototype, "it was as if there was a little dead person in [the box] ... because it was perfect in all its proportions it just looked odd." Sculptor John Brown remembers putting the prototype next to the Lady Penelope puppet from Thunderbirds and gauging his colleagues' response: "When they saw it, some people were horrified by the difference. Some didn't like it, some did." It has been argued that facial expression was sacrificed to make the appearance more realistic. Sculptor Terry Curtis recalls:

Fellow sculptor John Blundall called the new design "ridiculous", criticising the attempts to make the puppets appear more lifelike on the basis that "we always try to do with puppets what you can't do with humans." He suggested that the transition from caricature to realism was at the expense of the marionettes' "character and personality", arguing that "if the puppet appears completely natural, the audience no longer has to use its imagination." Effects director Derek Meddings thought that although the new puppets were "very convincing miniature people", they were flawed in that audiences "couldn't identify one from the other. The heads were so small they didn't have any character to their faces." Supervising puppeteer Christine Glanville considered the puppets "awful" from a practical perspective, recalling that their smaller, lighter heads rarely moved fluidly: "If you wanted them to turn their heads then more often than not there would be someone out of shot, with their fingers just above the puppet's head, actually turning it round."

Gerry Anderson said that he pushed for the new design to satisfy the audience, regarding it not as "a case of moving to a new technique, but more a case of incorporating new ideas with existing methods." However, in later years he expressed doubts about the wisdom of the redesign: "[T]he problem was that exact and precise movements became more vital than ever and that caused us terrible difficulties."

The new design has been praised by Vincent Terrace, Jeff Evans and John Peel. Applauding the transfer of the electronics from the heads to the bodies, Evans describes the puppets as "perfect in proportion", while Peel argues that the increased realism would not have put off audiences familiar with the earlier design. A contrary view is held by Daniel O'Brien, who writes that the loss of the puppets' "idiosyncratic character" reduced them to the level of "de luxe Action Men". On the costume design, Mark Bould writes positively of the series' "commitment to fashion" and singles out the design of the Angel uniforms for particular praise.

Characters and voice cast

Captain Scarlet had the largest regular puppet cast of any Supermarionation production. Its use of a British protagonist was a departure from earlier series like Thunderbirds, whose lead characters had been written as Americans to increase their appeal to the profitable US market. Stephen La Rivière suggests that Century 21 had been encouraged to give greater prominence to British characters due to the transatlantic success of British programmes like The Avengers, The Baron and The Saint, which had made it "altogether more acceptable to have English lead characters". Chris Drake and Graeme Bassett argue that the general style of the voice acting in Captain Scarlet was less exaggerated than before, relating this increased realism to the puppets' transition from caricatured to natural proportions. According to Simon Archer and Marcus Hearn, the proliferation of British accents between Thunderbirds and Captain Scarlet changed the sound of Supermarionation and its impression on the viewer.

Francis Matthews, who supplied the voice of Captain Scarlet, had turned down offers to voice characters in Thunderbirds. According to Matthews, Gerry Anderson went to great lengths to cast him after being impressed by his imitation of Cary Grant in a radio programme, and indeed the actor based the voice of Scarlet on Grant's Mid-Atlantic tones. Anderson, however, stated in his biography that the Grant impression was Matthews' choice at audition, and that while it was not the voice that had been intended for Scarlet the production was happy to use it.

Matthews' co-star in the film Dracula: Prince of Darkness (1966) had been Charles Tingwell, who was chosen to voice Cloudbase medical officer Dr Fawn. Tingwell, who had provided voices for Series Two of Thunderbirds as well as the feature film Thunderbirds Are Go, had been recommended by fellow Australian Ray Barrett, a regular voice artist on Stingray and Thunderbirds. Due to theatre commitments, Tingwell left the series following the completion of the first 12 episodes. Departing at the same time was Paul Maxwell, the voice of Captain Grey (and previously Steve Zodiac in Fireball XL5 and Captain Travers in Thunderbirds Are Go), who left to take up the role of Steve Tanner in Coronation Street. In Tingwell and Maxwell's absence, Fawn and Grey's roles were reduced to a handful of non-speaking appearances, though guest characters voiced by the actors can be heard in flashbacks to earlier episodes.

Cy Grant, the voice of Lieutenant Green, was known to the Andersons for his appearances on Tonight, in which he sang calypsos inspired by current affairs. The casting of Grant led to that of Ed Bishop as Captain Blue. Bishop, who was working in theatre and had the same agent as Grant, recalled in an interview: "And [my agent's representative] said, 'Oh, by the way, Mr Anderson, we've just taken on a new, young American actor' – shows you how long ago it was – 'a new American actor, name of Edward Bishop. And we know how much you like American voices. Would you like to meet him as well?'"

Donald Gray, who had found himself typecast after playing the lead role of detective Mark Saber in The Vise, was having to resort to voice work to sustain his acting career. He had three regular roles in Captain Scarlet: Colonel White, the Mysterons and Captain Black (who, after being taken over by the Mysterons, speaks in their voice). The deep, echoing tones of Black and the Mysterons were created by recording Gray's lines at high speed and then playing them back at normal speed.

The voice of Captain Ochre was provided by Jeremy Wilkin, who had voiced Virgil Tracy in Thunderbirds Series Two. Captain Magenta, meanwhile, was voiced by Gary Files, who had provided supporting voices in Thunderbird 6. Liz Morgan was new to the Anderson productions and voiced Destiny Angel, leader of the Angel squadron, and one of her comrades, Rhapsody Angel. Sylvia Anderson, the voice of Lady Penelope in Thunderbirds, took the role of Melody, while Canadian actress Janna Hill voiced Symphony. Morgan was additionally cast as Harmony Angel and voiced the character in five episodes. About a third of the way through the dialogue recording sessions, the role was reassigned to Chinese actress Lian-Shin, who voiced the character in only one episode ("The Launching") but was credited for 20.

Supporting character voices were performed by Anderson, Files, Hill, Maxwell, Morgan, Tingwell and Wilkin. Completing the credited cast were David Healy and Martin King. Shane Rimmer, previously heard as Scott Tracy in Thunderbirds, made a number of uncredited vocal contributions besides writing for the series. Neil McCallum voiced guest characters in four episodes but was also uncredited. After Captain Scarlet, six members of the voice cast would continue their association with Century 21. Healy voiced Shane Weston in Joe 90 and Files voiced Matthew Harding in The Secret Service. Wilkin, Morgan and King all had various supporting roles in these two series. Bishop later appeared in the lead role of Commander Ed Straker in UFO, the Andersons' first live-action series.

Character dialogue was recorded once a fortnight, at up to four episodes a session, at the Anvil Films Recording Studio (now Denham Film Studios) in Denham, Buckinghamshire. Each actor was paid 15 guineas (15 pounds and 15 shillings) per episode, plus repeat fees, no matter how many lines he or she spoke. They were not given the opportunity to tour the Century 21 studios in Slough until their work was finished and therefore had no visualisation of their characters during the recording sessions. This was to Morgan's regret: "We all said that we wished we had seen the puppets before doing the dialogue, as it would have been helpful to have something physical to base the voices on. I knew that Destiny was French and that Rhapsody had to be frightfully 'Sloaney', but that was about it."

Music

The music for Captain Scarlet was composed by Barry Gray, who had scored all prior Supermarionation series. The opening theme – titled "The Mysterons" – was produced electronically and accompanied by a seven-note staccato drumbeat to introduce the protagonist, Scarlet. Gerry Anderson, who had intended this to be more a traditional fanfare, said of his initial reaction: "I thought, 'Christ, is this all he could produce?' Looking back on it, however, I can see that what he came up with worked very well." The drumbeat also had two other functions: to cut from one scene to another, with the shot alternating between the previous scene and the next in time with each beat; and to cut into and out of each episode's midpoint advert break, where it was accompanied by a zooming image of the Spectrum logo (a stylised "S" on a background of concentric rings in the colours of the rainbow).

Two versions of the closing theme – "Captain Scarlet" – were recorded. The first version, used on the first 14 episodes, was mostly instrumental with the words "Captain Scarlet!" sung at intervals by a group of vocalists including Ken Barrie; each instance was followed by vocoded repetition supplied by Gray himself. It was later reworked as a song with lyrics performed by The Spectrum, a London boy band who happened to share their name with the fictional Spectrum Organisation. Originally formed in 1960, at the time of their involvement with Captain Scarlet the group were signed to RCA Victor and being promoted as an English imitation of The Monkees. They were brought to the Andersons' attention by Gerry's chauffeur, who had heard them on pirate radio, and signed a contract with Century 21 worth £100,000.

As well as the opening and closing themes, between March and December 1967 Gray recorded incidental music for 18 episodes. Music for the other 14 was supplied by re-using these scores, supplemented by excerpts of music originally produced for earlier Anderson series. Compared to Thunderbirds, the incidental music for Captain Scarlet was recorded using smaller ensembles: no episode featured more than 16 instruments.

In their notes on the CD release, Ralph Titterton and Tim Mallett write that the Captain Scarlet soundtrack has a "military feel" that favours percussion, brass and wind instruments, contrasting with the full orchestral sound of Thunderbirds. Gray preferred traditional instruments for much of the action, generally restricting his use of electronic music to scenes set in outer space as well as a four-note echoing motif used to identify the Mysterons. Scarlet's motif, used in incidental music as well as both versions of the closing theme, is a variation emphasising the captain's nature as an ex-Mysteron. Gray performed some of the series' electronic music himself.

Reviewing the soundtrack, Bruce Eder of AllMusic describes the collection of theme and incidental music as "a strange mix of otherworldly 'music of the spheres', late–50s/early–60s 'space-age pop', 'British Invasion' beat, Scottish folk-inspired tunes, kids-style 'Mickey Mouse' scoring, martial music, light jazz, and light classical". He singles out the two versions of "White as Snow" from the episode of the same name, "Cocktail Music" from the episode "Model Spy" and a piano piece from "The Inquisition" (which Gray performed himself) for particular praise. In his BBC Online review, Peter Marsh suggests that the music's grim tone reflects the series' use of realistic puppets and presentation of death as well as its frightening alien villains and lack of humour, noting that "dissonant vibraphone chords shimmer under hovering, tremulous strings contrasted with urgent, militaristic drums and pulsing brass – driving the action ever onto its climax (and, no doubt, a big explosion)."

Commercial releases
In 1967, Century 21 Records (a label founded by Century 21 and Pye Records) released an extended play titled TV Themes from Captain Scarlet, which included commercial re-recordings of the series' opening and closing theme music. The soundtrack has since had two CD releases: the first by Silva Screen Records, the second by Fanderson, the official Gerry Anderson fan club. Fanderson's version was available exclusively to club members and contained music from every episode except "The Heart of New York" and "Treble Cross" (which contain no original music) and "Traitor" (whose cue recordings are lost). Both CD releases' tracks are listed below.

Silva Screen Records (2003)

Fanderson (2015)

Title sequences and end credits

All episodes, except the first, incorporate two title sequences. The first of these, incorporating the title card and principal production credits, is set in a run-down alleyway and presented from the point of view of an unseen gunman; turning a corner, he comes face to face with Captain Scarlet and opens fire, only to be shot dead by a single round from the captain's handgun. The words "Captain Scarlet" appear letter by letter in time with the seven strikes of the series' signature drumbeat composed by Barry Gray. This sequence is intended to demonstrate Scarlet's indestructibility, the bullets from the assassin's machine gun having no effect on the captain.

The sequence is accompanied by a voiceover from Ed Bishop that states:

A number of variations have been used. In the first episode, the voiceover runs:

An alternative version, rarely used, runs: "One man. A man who is different. Chosen by fate. Caught up in Earth's unwanted conflict with the Mysterons. Determined. Courageous. Indestructible. His name: Captain Scarlet." Later prints feature an additional voiceover by Donald Gray, warning the audience: "Captain Scarlet is indestructible. You are not. Remember this. Do not try to imitate him." This served to establish the background to the series and warn younger viewers not to put themselves at risk by copying Scarlet's actions. It was used either on its own or following Bishop's "One man ..." voiceover.

From the second episode, "Winged Assassin", the establishing scenes are followed by a secondary title sequence introducing Captain Blue, Colonel White, the Angels and Captain Black. As the Mysterons announce their latest threat against Earth, the Mysteron rings pass over the characters in various environments, thus demonstrating the aliens' omnipresence. At the same time, the characters' codenames are flashed on-screen. The Mysterons invariably begin their threats with the words: "This is the voice of the Mysterons. We know that you can hear us, Earthmen."

The closing titles were originally intended to feature images of printed circuit boards and other electronic components to reflect the Andersons' initial conception of Scarlet as a "mechanical man". In the finished sequence, these were replaced with a series of paintings depicting Scarlet in various moments of peril. In earlier episodes, the paintings are accompanied by the instrumental version of the Captain Scarlet theme music; in later episodes, this was substituted by a lyrical version sung by The Spectrum. The paintings were created by comic artist Ron Embleton, who would later illustrate the adult comic strips Oh, Wicked Wanda! and Sweet Chastity for Penthouse magazine. In 2005, the Animation Art Gallery in London released limited-edition prints of the paintings signed by Francis Matthews.

In Japan, the original opening titles were replaced with a montage of action clips from various episodes accompanied by an upbeat song performed by children. This version is included in the special features of the Captain Scarlet DVD box set.

Broadcast history
Captain Scarlet had its official UK premiere on 29 September 1967 on the ATV Midlands franchise of the ITV network. The first episode was seen by an estimated 450,000 people, a number considered promising. Exactly five months earlier, this episode had been broadcast in the London area as an unscheduled late-night test transmission. The series officially debuted in London and Scotland on 1 October, with the Granada, Anglia, Channel, Southern and Westward franchises all following later that month. By the end of 1967, 4.95 million UK households – the equivalent of 10.9 million people – were watching the series. In the Midlands, viewing figures had risen to 1.1 million halfway through the run.

By the start of the 1968, Captain Scarlet was being broadcast in all parts of the UK. The series was also shown in more than 40 other countries, including Canada, Australia, New Zealand and Japan. In the United States, it aired in first-run syndication. Only six episodes were shown in the Netherlands.

UK re-runs varied markedly by franchise. Granada, Harlech and Tyne Tees Television repeated the series until 1972, while in the Midlands, it aired four times in colour between 1969 and 1974. By contrast, Yorkshire Television did not show any repeats until the mid-1980s, when the series was re-broadcast on Saturday and Sunday mornings by various franchises across the network. The series was later shown in segmented form on Night Network.

Captain Scarlet was subsequently acquired by the BBC, which on 1 October 1993 began the series' first UK-wide network run on BBC2. The first episode drew an audience of four million, the channel's third-highest viewing figure of the week. In September 2001, the BBC started repeating the series in digitally-remastered form. Following the September 11 attacks, the episode order was changed: "Winged Assassin" (in which the Mysterons destroy an airliner) and "Big Ben Strikes Again" (in which they hi-jack a nuclear device), were postponed due to perceived similarities between the plots and real-world events. These episodes were eventually broadcast in November and December 2001.

Reception

Although Thunderbirds had run for two series, Grade's unexpected cancellation of that production led Gerry Anderson to assume that there was no possibility of Captain Scarlet lasting more than one. In Anderson's words: "I didn't expect it to continue. I simply went to Lew and asked, 'What's the next thing you want us to do?

Captain Scarlet is widely regarded as "darker" or more "mature" in tone than earlier Supermarionation productions. According to Andrew Billen: "Whereas Thunderbirds was about rescuing people, Scarlet was about damnation, the soul of a resurrected man being fought for between Captain Scarlet and the equally indestructible Captain Black. It was Anderson's Gothic period." Marcus Hearn writes that the series has a "militaristic" feel, with less emphasis on "characterisation and charm" compared to its precursors and Joe 90. For Jim Sangster and Paul Condon, the optimism of Stingray and Thunderbirds is noticeably absent, the heroism and unqualified victories in those series being replaced by desperate games of "damage limitation" as Scarlet and Spectrum rush to counter every Mysteron move, sometimes unsuccessfully. Discussion of the series' presentation of death and destruction has led some commentators to question its suitability for younger viewers: media historian Daniel O'Brien notes that Captain Scarlet is "rated by some as the most violently destructive children's show ever". The horror of the Mysterons has also been recognised: in 2003, the depiction of the aliens was ranked 82nd in Channel 4's list show 100 Greatest Scary Moments.

Commentators have drawn parallels with the state of international relations at the time the series was made. Robert Sellers writes that Captain Scarlet arose from "1960s sci-fi obsession with alien forces infiltrating society", which he suggests were derived from fears about the Cold War and communism. For Nicholas J. Cull, the "war of nerves" between Earth and Mars is a reflection of contemporary geopolitical conflict, while the "enemy within" scenario of Martians taking over human beings is comparabe to plots of films such as Invasion of the Body Snatchers (1956). Mark Bould argues that the series "seemed in tune with a decade of civil disobedience and anti-imperialist guerrilla wars" – a view echoed by Rebecca Feasey of the University of Edinburgh, who regards it as one of several series that "exploited the fears of 1960s America" in its portrayal of "civil disobedience and the potentially negative impact of new technologies". Since 2001, comparisons have also been made to the September 11 attacks and the ensuing War on Terror. Sangster and Condon argue that for a 1960s series, Captain Scarlet was "incredibly perceptive" in its conception of the Mysterons, whose tactics they liken to terrorism.

To others, Captain Scarlet remains a "camp classic". According to Bould, it is one of several Anderson productions to depict "a utopian future benefiting from world government, high technology, ethnic diversity, and a generally positive sense of Americanisation. They articulate the commonly made connection between technological developments and economic prosperity." He also writes that the series espouses "Euro-cool consumerism". A recurring concept in the Supermarionation productions, world government was inspired by Gerry Anderson's thoughts on the subject: "I had all sorts of fancy ideas about the future ... we had the United Nations and I imagined that the world would come together and there would be a world government." On the depiction of technology, Peter Wright notes the "qualified technophilia" that Captain Scarlet shares with Thunderbirds.

The series has been criticised for its camerawork, which some view as too static due to the crew's inability to move the puppets convincingly. Criticism has also been directed at the characterisation and writing. Sangster and Condon consider the plots uncomplicated and the characters perhaps "even more simplistic" than those of Stingray. Some have blamed the return to 25-minute episodes, coming after Thunderbirds 50-minute format, for a lack of subplots and perceived drop in the quality of the storytelling. In a 1986 interview, script editor Tony Barwick described Captain Scarlet as "hard-nosed stuff" that lacked humour, adding: "It was all for the American market and to that extent there was no deep characterisation. [The characters] all balanced one against the other." Sylvia Anderson likened the presentation to that of a "comic strip", arguing that the action format came at the expense of the character development. In contrast, Jeff Evans believes the characters to be "more detailed" than before, arguing that Captain Scarlet was the first Anderson production to give them "private lives and real identities". Paul Cornell, Martin Day and Keith Topping praise the writing, judging it "neither as silly as previous Anderson efforts, nor as po-faced as later ones".

In a comparison to Thunderbirds, writer John Peel sums up Captain Scarlet as "better puppets, bigger action and a huge step backwards in stories", arguing that the advances in Century 21's special effects were to the detriment of the writing. He compares this to the relative failure of Indiana Jones and the Temple of Doom following the success of Raiders of the Lost Ark: "Anderson made the same mistake that George Lucas made, assuming that if the effects were praised in Thunderbirds, the public wanted a show with more effects." Peel also finds fault with Scarlet himself, arguing that an "indestructible" hero who freely risks his safety to foil the enemy served as a poor role model for children and made the episode endings too predictable. Sangster and Condon echo the latter point, writing that Scarlet's abilities weaken the suspense and make him "a difficult hero to believe in".

Considered a cult programme by some, Captain Scarlet came 33rd in a 2007 Radio Times poll to determine the greatest science fiction series of all time. It was ranked 51st in Channel 4's 2001 list show 100 Greatest Kids' TV Shows. Cornell, Day and Topping argue that the series is perhaps Gerry Anderson's best production. However, Anderson's own verdict was clear: "Nothing was as successful as Thunderbirds. Captain Scarlet and the Mysterons was very successful, but once you've had a smash hit, everything tends to look less successful in comparison."

Race, gender and symbolism

Captain Scarlet has attracted both positive and negative commentary on its use of female and mixed ethnicity characters – an aspect that according to Daniel O'Brien gives the series a "more cosmopolitan" feel compared to Thunderbirds. During its 1993 re-run on BBC2, the series drew some criticism for its use of the codenames "Black" and "White" in reference to the benevolent Colonel White and the villainous Captain Black, which some commentators interpreted as a form of negative black-and-white dualism. Defending the series against claims of racist stereotyping, Gerry Anderson pointed out that it features heroic non-white characters in the form of Lieutenant Green and Melody and Harmony Angels. Green is the only black male regular character in any of the Supermarionation series.

For Sellers, the inclusion of Green and especially Melody Angel, a black female character, shows that Captain Scarlet was "actually ahead of its time in respect to race relations". He also regards the Angel squad's all-female composition as significant from a point of view of women's emancipation. O'Brien is less complimentary on this latter point, arguing that while it was progressive for the 1960s, to newer audiences it comes across more as a "conventionally sexist male fantasy".

The diversity of the characters in terms of race and gender has been viewed highly in academic publications. Bould praises the "beautiful, multi-ethnic, female Angel fighter pilots" and "secondary roles played by capable women". In a 2003 interview, Anderson noted the effort made to feature ethnic minorities: "... I think people who make television programmes have a responsibility, particularly when children are watching avidly and you know their minds can be affected almost irreversibly as they grow up. We were very conscious of introducing different ethnic backgrounds."

Cy Grant, the voice of Green, believed that Captain Scarlet had both positive multicultural value and an allegorical nature. He argued that religious symbolism was implied, with Colonel White serving as an analogue for God, Captain Black as the Devil and Scarlet as the Son of God; the allegory extended to Cloudbase, which represented Heaven and was guarded by a fleet of fighters codenamed "Angels". On dualism, he argued: "The 'darkness' of the Mysterons is most easily seen as the psychological rift – the struggle of 'good' and 'evil' – of the Western world as personified by Colonel White and his team. Dark and light are but aspects of each other. Incidentally, green is the colour of nature that can heal that rift."

Other media

The ATV game show The Golden Shot, hosted by Bob Monkhouse, used Captain Scarlet as the theme for its 1967 Christmas special. Broadcast live on 23 December, the programme featured guest appearances from Francis Matthews and The Spectrum.

Since its first appearance, the TV series has been supplemented by merchandise ranging from toy action figures to video games. Among the early tie-ins were a series of five audio plays released by Century 21 Records in 1967. Taking the form of a vinyl EP record, each play was approximately 21 minutes long and featured the voice cast from the TV series. Angus P. Allan wrote the first play, Introducing Captain Scarlet (set during the denouement of the first TV episode) as well as Captain Scarlet and the Mysterons and Captain Scarlet of Spectrum. The other two – Captain Scarlet is Indestructible and Captain Scarlet versus Captain Black – were written by his assistant, Richard O'Neill. To mark Captain Scarlets 50th anniversary in 2017, Big Finish Productions digitally remastered the plays and re-released them on CD; the seven-disc set also includes audio adaptations of eight of the TV episodes with narration by Ed Bishop as Captain Blue.

During the 1960s, Century 21 granted more than 60 licences for Captain Scarlet products and released a range of friction-drive model vehicles through its subsidiary Century 21 Toys. Meccano Ltd manufactured Captain Scarlet Dinky Toys to great success: its SPV was its best-selling die-cast toy of all time and continued to be produced until 1976. Waddingtons released a Captain Scarlet board game based on snakes and ladders. In 1993, Vivid Imaginations launched a new range of toys to coincide with the BBC2 repeats.

Books and comics
Between 1967 and 1968, Armada Books published three Captain Scarlet children's novels by John William Jennison (who wrote under the pseudonym "John Theydon"): Captain Scarlet and the Mysterons, Captain Scarlet and the Silent Saboteur and The Angels and the Creeping Enemy. As implied by its title, the third novel features the Spectrum Angels as the main characters. In 1993, Young Corgi Books released children's novelisations of "The Mysterons", "Lunarville 7", "Noose of Ice" and "The Launching".

From September 1967, comic strips based on the series were printed in TV Century 21 (later TV21), published by City Magazines in association with Century 21. The comic had already featured Fireball XL5, Stingray and Thunderbirds strips as well as crossovers between the three, indicating that they were set in a shared fictional world of the 2060s; Captain Scarlet was integrated into this setting. Elements of the new series, including Captain Black, had been introduced as early as June 1967. The initial Captain Scarlet strips were drawn by Ron Embleton, succeeded first by Mike Noble and then Jim Watson. After the TV series finished its original run, the comic continued the story of Spectrum and the Mysterons, with subsequent adventures showing that the Mysterons deactivate their city on Mars and relinquish their control over Black while Scarlet leaves Spectrum to fight Earth-bound threats. The Mysterons eventually reawaken, prompting Scarlet and Spectrum to resume their struggle. Captain Scarlet was also featured in TV21 and Century 21 annuals for 1967, 1968 and 1969. In September 1969, the series was dropped from TV21.

The series' TV21 debut had been preceded by spin-off adventures in the sister comics Lady Penelope and Solo. In January 1967, Lady Penelope launched a comic strip about the Angel pilots; this ran until May 1968 but introduced no elements of the Spectrum Organisation until August 1967. Solo printed two strips: the first from June to September 1967; the second, following a merger with City Magazine's TV Tornado, from September 1967 to February 1968. The first, The Mark of the Mysterons, bore little relation to Captain Scarlet besides featuring the Mysterons as villains; it was set in the 1960s and the presentation was similar to that of The Invaders. The second, simply titled The Mysterons, saw the aliens travelling to the Andromeda Galaxy on a campaign of conquest.

After the series' discontinuation in Century 21 and City titles, Polystyle Publications printed further strips in Countdown comic and annuals between 1971 and 1972. From 1993 to 1994, Fleetway Editions published a dedicated Captain Scarlet comic to coincide with the series' first run on BBC2. New annuals were published by Grandreams in 1993 and 1994 and Carlton Books in 2001.

In Japan, Weekly Shōnen Sunday serialised a manga adaptation of Captain Scarlet between 1967 and 1968. A separate adaptation was published in Shōnen Book from January to August 1968.

Home video
The series' first VHS release in the UK was by Precision Video in 1982. Precision was later acquired by Channel 5 Video (a partnership of PolyGram and Heron International), which issued further Captain Scarlet cassettes over the course of the 1980s. Between 2001 and 2002, Carlton Video re-released the series in volumes and as a box set. These featured the remastered picture and sound quality that had been introduced for the 2000s repeats. The box set includes an extra tape containing Captain Scarlet: The Indestructible, a behind-the-scenes feature.

Since September 2001, Captain Scarlet has also been available on Region 2 DVD in both its original mono soundtrack and new Dolby Digital surround sound. Bonus features include audio commentaries by Gerry Anderson on two episodes, "The Mysterons" and "Attack on Cloudbase", as well as the five audio adventures from the 1960s. As with the VHS releases, the DVDs have also been released as a box set; this includes an extra disc featuring a production documentary, Captain Scarlet S.I.G., along with a set of five alternative title sequences. A Region 1 box set by A&E Home Video was released in 2002. In 2004, Imavision released a French-language box set for the Canadian market.

On the series' 50th anniversary in September 2017, British company Network Distributing announced that it was releasing Captain Scarlet on Blu-ray Disc with all episodes remastered in high definition using the original 35 mm film negatives. The Blu-ray range was released between 2017 and 2018 both in volumes and as a box set.

UK remastered VHS releases by Carlton Video

UK DVD first releases by Carlton Video

UK Blu-ray releases by Network Distributing

Video games
Between 2002 and 2006, three Captain Scarlet video games were released. A further game was cancelled.

Later productions

Since the 1980s, the rights to the ITC catalogue have changed hands a number of times. They were acquired first by PolyGram Entertainment, then, following a partial sale to the BBC, by Carlton International. In 2004, Carlton merged with Granada to form ITV plc; the rights to Captain Scarlet and other Anderson series now reside with its subsidiary ITV Studios.

In the early 1980s, Robert Mandell and ITC New York combined several episodes of Captain Scarlet to create two compilation films: Captain Scarlet vs. the Mysterons and Revenge of the Mysterons from Mars. Promoted as "Super Space Theater", these were broadcast on American cable TV with the aim of reviving transatlantic syndication sales. Other Anderson productions, including Stingray and Thunderbirds, received similar treatments. Released on British VHS in January 1982, Revenge of the Mysterons from Mars was Captain Scarlets UK home video debut. In November 1988, it aired as the second episode of the movie-mocking series Mystery Science Theater 3000 on Minnesota TV station KTMA.

Plans for a live-action film adaptation of Captain Scarlet, announced by Gerry Anderson in 2000 and 2002, remain undeveloped.

Remake

In 1999, Anderson supervised the production of a computer-animated test film, Captain Scarlet and the Return of the Mysterons, to explore the possibility of updating some of his 1960s puppet series for a 21st-century audience. Produced by the Moving Picture Company under the working title Captain Scarlet – The New Millennium, the four-minute film was made using a combination of Maya animation software and motion capture technology and saw Francis Matthews and Ed Bishop reprise the voices of Captains Scarlet and Blue. Set a few years after the Mysterons apparently cease hostilities against Earth, the film features the reappearance of Captain Black, setting the stage for a revival of the war with Mars. The film was screened at a Fanderson convention in 2000 and a science lecture in 2001. It was released on Blu-ray in 2017.

Plans for a full computer-animated Captain Scarlet series eventually resulted in Gerry Anderson's New Captain Scarlet. A reboot of the original, this was first broadcast on the ITV children's show Ministry of Mayhem in 2005. In a nod to Supermarionation, the animation used to make the series was promoted as "Hypermarionation". New Captain Scarlet was the last TV series to be produced by Anderson, who died in 2012.

Notes

References

Primary sources

Secondary sources

Works cited

Captain Scarlet volume originally published separately as:

Production locations

External links

Captain Scarlet and the Mysterons at the official Gerry Anderson website

The Gerry Anderson Complete Comic History – "Captain Scarlet and the Mysterons: TV21, 1967–68"
 

 
1960s British children's television series
1960s British science fiction television series
1967 British television series debuts
1968 British television series endings
British children's action television series
British children's science fiction television series
British television shows featuring puppetry
English-language television shows
Fiction set in 2068
First-run syndicated television programs in the United States
ITV children's television shows
Marionette films
Space adventure television series
Television series by ITC Entertainment
Television series set in the 2060s
Television shows adapted into comics
Television shows adapted into novels
Television shows adapted into video games
Articles containing video clips